Emilija Stoilovska (born 29 January 1994) is a Macedonian footballer who plays as a midfielder for the North Macedonia national team.

International career
Stoilovska made her debut for the North Macedonia national team on 7 June 2016, against Iceland.

References

1994 births
Living people
Women's association football midfielders
Macedonian women's footballers
North Macedonia women's international footballers